The Gooch House is a Queen Anne style house located in Frankfort, Kentucky. The building formerly housed the Frankfort Visitor's Center and the offices of the Frankfort/Franklin County Tourist & Convention Commission, the Frankfort Area Chamber of Commerce, and the Downtown Frankfort, Inc. It was purchased in 2019 by the Kentucky Distillers Association to be used as the new headquarters for the non-profit trade group that represents the state's signature Bourbon and distilled spirits industry. The property was added to the U.S. National Register of Historic Places in 1980.

References

Houses completed in 1895
Houses in Frankfort, Kentucky
Queen Anne architecture in Kentucky
National Register of Historic Places in Frankfort, Kentucky
Houses on the National Register of Historic Places in Kentucky
1895 establishments in Kentucky
Bourbon whiskey